Brigadier Mark William Dunham  (born 1961) is a retired Royal Marines officer who served as the Deputy Commandant General. He was born in Lincolnshire in 1961.

References

1961 births
Commanders of the Order of the British Empire
Living people
Royal Marines generals
Royal Navy personnel of the Iraq War
Royal Navy personnel of the War in Afghanistan (2001–2021)
People educated at Boston Grammar School
Military personnel from Lincolnshire